Aliabad-e Tapancheh (also Romanized as Alīābād-e Ţapāncheh) is a village in Deh Abbas Rural District, in the Central District of Eslamshahr County, Tehran Province, Iran. At the 2006 census, its population was 4,562, in 1,094 families.

References 

Populated places in Eslamshahr County